Mercury Steam Entertainment S.L., doing business as MercurySteam, is a Spanish video game developer based in San Sebastián de los Reyes, Madrid. The company was founded by former members of Rebel Act Studios, who previously developed Severance: Blade of Darkness in 2001. Dave Cox is a producer at Konami who has helped out MercurySteam during the Castlevania: Lords of Shadow trilogy.

In 2015, Nintendo Life reported that MercurySteam had worked on a Metroid prototype for Wii U and Nintendo 3DS, that was later turned down and possibly retrofitted into a different project. It was later revealed that they had pitched for a remake of Metroid Fusion. This pitch was rejected, but because series creator Yoshio Sakamoto was impressed by the pitch and the team's love of Metroid, they were hired to collaborate on Metroid: Samus Returns instead.

In December 2020, Nordisk Film, under their Nordisk Games division, purchased a 40% stake in the studio.  MercurySteam collaborated with Nintendo again to develop a new Metroid game, Metroid Dread, for the Nintendo Switch, after the developers demonstrated that they could develop games for the platform.

Games developed

References

External links 

Companies based in the Community of Madrid
Video game companies established in 2002
Video game development companies
Video game companies of Spain
Spanish companies established in 2002